The New Castle Congregational Church is a congregation of the United Church of Christ, located at 65 Main Street in New Castle, New Hampshire.  Its church, the only ecclesiastical building in the small community, was built in 1828 by a local master builder, based on the architectural patterns published by Asher Benjamin, and also based in part on the St. John's Church in nearby Portsmouth. It has undergone little alteration since its construction.

The building was listed on the National Register of Historic Places in 2015, and the New Hampshire State Register of Historic Places in 2007.

See also
National Register of Historic Places listings in Rockingham County, New Hampshire

References

External links
Official church website

Churches on the National Register of Historic Places in New Hampshire
Churches completed in 1828
Congregational churches in New Hampshire
Churches in Rockingham County, New Hampshire
National Register of Historic Places in Rockingham County, New Hampshire
New Castle, New Hampshire